Conozoa is a genus of grasshoppers in the family Acrididae.

Species

References 

Acrididae genera
Oedipodinae
Taxa named by Henri Louis Frédéric de Saussure
Taxonomy articles created by Polbot